Teleghma (also Telerghma and Telergma) is a town and commune in Mila Province, Algeria. At the 2008 census it had a population of 48,846.

In late Antiquity and early Middle Ages the town was a centre of Byzantine Christianity.

Climate

References

Communes of Mila Province
Cities in Algeria
Algeria